General Potocki may refer to:

Antoni Potocki (1780–1850), Polish Army brigadier general
Antoni Michał Potocki (died 1766), Crown Army of Poland lieutenant general
Stanisław Kostka Potocki (1755–1821), Polish–Lithuanian Commonwealth general
Stanisław Szczęsny Potocki (1751–1805), Polish–Lithuanian Commonwealth general